Eva Stæhr-Nielsen, also known as Eva Wilhjelm, (1911–1976) was a Danish ceramic artist. 

Her work is included in the collections of the Seattle Art Museum the National Museum of Sweden, and the National Museum of Art, Architecture and Design, Oslo.

References

1911 births
1976 deaths
20th-century Danish artists